The Campeonato Brasileiro Série D (English: Brazilian Championship Serie D) is the fourth division of the Brazilian football league system, and was announced by the Brazilian Football Confederation (CBF) on April 9, 2008. The Campeonato Brasileiro Série D was formed from the split of the Série C, keeping its best 20 clubs and playing double round robin as does the top three divisions. The Série D keeps the same format of the older Série C, but with participation limited to 40 clubs recognized by the state federation. In 2016 the Série D was expanded to 68 clubs, but in 2022 it will be reduced to 64 clubs.

Champions of Série D
The following table shows the winners and runners-up of the Série D tournaments played since its beginning in 2009, according to the Brazilian Football Confederation:

Performances

By club

By state

Participations

Most appearances

Below is the list of clubs that have more appearances in the Campeonato Brasileiro Série D.

See also
 Campeonato Brasileiro Série A, the main division of Brazilian football
 Campeonato Brasileiro Série B, the second division of Brazilian football
 Campeonato Brasileiro Série C, the third division of Brazilian football
CBF

References

External links

 Brazilian Football Confederation (CBF)

 
4
4
Brazil
Professional sports leagues in Brazil